Irna may refer to:

People
 Irna Narulita (born 1970), Indonesian politician
 Irna Phillips (1901–1973), American author and actress

Places
 Umm Irna Formation, Jordan

Other
 Irna cyclone
 Islamic Republic News Agency (IRNA)